Pineview is a town in Wilcox County, Georgia, United States. Per the 2020 census, the population was 454.

History
A post office called Pineview was established in 1900. The Georgia General Assembly incorporated Pineview as a town in 1902. The community was named for the pine trees which are abundant in the area.

Geography

Pineview is located at  (32.110021, -83.500645).

Demographics

2020 census

Note: the US Census treats Hispanic/Latino as an ethnic category. This table excludes Latinos from the racial categories and assigns them to a separate category. Hispanics/Latinos can be of any race.

2000 Census
As of the census of 2000, there were 532 people, 185 households, and 120 families residing in the town. The racial makeup of the town was 35.71% White, 62.78% African American, 0.19% Asian, 0.75% from other races, and 0.56% from two or more races. Hispanic or Latino of any race were 0.75% of the population.

There were 185 households, out of which 30.3% had children under the age of 18 living with them, 28.6% were married couples living together, 29.2% had a female householder with no husband present, and 34.6% were non-families. 33.5% of all households were made up of individuals, and 15.7% had someone living alone who was 65 years of age or older.  The average household size was 2.45 and the average family size was 3.10.

In the town, the population was spread out, with 26.1% under the age of 18, 7.5% from 18 to 24, 20.3% from 25 to 44, 20.5% from 45 to 64, and 25.6% who were 65 years of age or older.  The median age was 42 years. For every 100 females, there were 77.9 males.  For every 100 females age 18 and over, there were 69.4 males.

The median income for a household in the town was $17,850, and the median income for a family was $19,904. Males had a median income of $22,250 versus $17,292 for females. The per capita income for the town was $11,914.  About 34.9% of families and 38.4% of the population were below the poverty line, including 51.3% of those under age 18 and 27.9% of those age 65 or over.

Education 
The Wilcox County School District holds pre-school to grade twelve, and consists of one elementary school, a middle school, and a high school. The district has 90 full-time teachers and over 1,439 students.

The schools, located in Rochelle, are:
Wilcox County Elementary School
Wilcox County Middle School
Wilcox County High School

Notable person
Nick Marshall, Auburn University quarterback

References

Towns in Wilcox County, Georgia
Towns in Georgia (U.S. state)